Harbour Cone from Peggy's Hill (1939) is an early oil painting by New Zealand artist Colin McCahon.

Subject 
Harbour Cone from Peggy's Hill is one of McCahon's earliest explorations of the Otago region. It depicts an elevated stance from the mountain tops, looking down towards Harbour Cone in the Otago Peninsula. This work is one of his more realistic creations - showing a clear landscape theme.

In addition to this exoteric representation, Harbour Cone from Peggy's Hill also contains more esoteric meanings. McCahon wanted this artwork to express "the concept of nature as a spiritual and redeeming
force." In a letter to his friend Toss Woollaston he explained:

Because of comments such as these, the painting has been read as an evangelical statement designed to connect together God, peace, and the landscape.

Reception

Early Controversy 
 Harbour Cone from Peggy's Hill  was behind one of the earliest controversies in McCahon's long career. It was excluded from the 1939 Otago Art Society exhibition, despite the fact that each member (including McCahon) was entitled to display one work. Linda Tyler believes that this rejection was due to the absence of support "from an interested and informed public."

References 

1939 paintings
Paintings in New Zealand
New Zealand paintings
Landscape paintings